Microcar is a term often used for the smallest size of cars, with three or four wheels and often an engine smaller than . Specific types of microcars include bubble cars, cycle cars, invacar, quadricycles and voiturettes. Microcars are often covered by separate regulations to normal cars, having relaxed requirements for registration and licensing.

Predecessors 

Voiturette is a term used by some small cars and tricycles manufactured from 1895 to 1910.

Cyclecars are a type of small, lightweight and inexpensive car manufactured mainly between 1910 and the late 1920s.

Europe 1940-1970: Microcars 

The first cars to be described as microcars (earlier equivalents were called voiturettes or cyclecars) were built in the United Kingdom and Germany following World War II, and remained popular until the 1960s. They were originally called minicars, but later became known as microcars.

France also produced large numbers of similar tiny vehicles called voiturettes, but they were rarely sold abroad.

Characteristics 
Microcars have three or four wheels, although most were three-wheelers which, in many countries, meant that they qualified for lower taxes and were licensed as motorcycles. Often, the engine was originally designed for a motorcycle.

History 
Microcars originated in the years following World War II, when motorcycles transport was commonly used. To provide better weather protection, three-wheeled microcars began increasing in popularity in the United Kingdom, where they could be driven using only a motorcycle licence. One of the first microcars was the 1949 Bond Minicar.

Microcars also became popular in Europe. A demand for cheap personal motorised transport emerged, and their greater fuel efficiency meant that microcars became even more significant when fuel prices rose, partly due to the 1956 Suez Crisis.

The microcar boom lasted until the late 1950s, when larger cars regained popularity. The 1959 introduction of the Mini, which provided greater size and performance at an affordable price, contributed to the decline in popularity of microcars. Production of microcars had largely ceased by the end of the 1960s, due to competition from the Mini, Citroën 2CV, Fiat 500 and Renault 4.

Bubble cars 

Several microcars of the 1950s and 1960s were nicknamed bubble cars. This was due to the aircraft-style bubble canopies of vehicles such as the Messerschmitt KR175, Messerschmitt KR200 and the FMR Tg500. Other microcars, such as the Isetta, also had a bubble-like appearance.

German manufacturers of bubble cars included former military aircraft manufacturers Messerschmitt and Heinkel. BMW manufactured the Italian Iso Rivolta Isetta under licence, using an engine from one of their own motorcycles.

The United Kingdom had licence-built right-hand-drive versions of the Heinkel Kabine and the Isetta.  The British version of the Isetta was built with only one rear wheel, instead of the narrow-tracked pair of wheels in the normal Isetta design, in order to take advantage of the three-wheel vehicle laws in the United Kingdom. There were also indigenous British three-wheeled microcars, including the Peel Trident.

Examples include the Citroën Prototype C, FMR Tg500, Fuldamobil, Heinkel Kabine, Isetta, Messerschmitt KR175, Messerschmitt KR200, Peel P50, Peel Trident, SMZ S-1L, Trojan 200, and Kleinschnittger F125.

Europe 1990-present 
Recent microcars include the 2001 Aixam 5xx series, Renault Twizy, Citroen Ami and XEV Yoyo. 

Electric-powered microcars which have reached production include the 1987 CityEl, the 1990 Automobiles ERAD Spacia, the 1999 Corbin Sparrow, the 2001 REVAi, the 2009 Tazzari Zero and the resurrected Peel P50 of 2011 (the original model of 1962 - 65 being petrol powered).

The Smart Fortwo is often called a microcar in the United States; although it requires a regular licence to drive.

Quadricycle legislation 

The European Union introduced the quadricycle category in 1992. In several European countries since then, microcars are classified by governments separately from normal cars, sometimes using the same regulations as motorcycles or mopeds. Therefore, compared with normal cars, microcars often have relaxed requirements for registration and licensing, and can be subject to lower taxes and insurance costs.

Microcar trucks 
There are also a variety of microcar trucks, usually of the "forward control" or van style to provide more cargo room.  These might be used for local deliveries on narrow streets that are unsuited to larger vehicles. The Piaggio Ape is a three-wheeled example. The Honda Acty is a four-wheeled example.

Microcars by country of origin

See also 

 Car classification
 Economy car
 
 Neighborhood Electric Vehicle
 Velomobile

References 

 
Car classifications
Quadricycles